2014 Soeratin Cup is a football competition which is intended for footballers born before 1 January 1997. The competition is scheduled to begin in August 2014 and ends in December 2014.

PSDS Deli Serdang is the defending champion. Charis Yulianto was chosen to be the ambassador for this tournament.

Jember United U-17 won the championship after beating Persis Solo U-17 3–1 in the final. Gian Zola Nasrulloh became top scorer with nine goals and Faisol Yunus got the Best Player award.

Competition format
It will consists of three rounds, which are the province, regional and national round. The national round will have a group phase and after that semi-finals and final.

Province round

North Sumatra Zone
PS Bintang Jaya U-17 became champion and qualifies for the regional round.

|-

|}

West Sumatra Zone
The final was played in Haji Agus Salim Stadium on 9 September 2014. PSP Padang U-17 became the champion and qualify to the regional round.

|-

|}

Bengkulu Zone
Twelve teams will participate and matches will start on 7 October 2014. Matches will be played in Stadion Semarak. Bengkulu Tengah U-17 became champion.

Jambi Zone
Eleven teams will participate and matches will start on 27 September 2014. Matches will be played in Stadion Karya Bhakti. Batang Hari FC became champion.

Riau Zone
Rumbai FC U-17 became the champion.

Bangka–Belitung Islands Zone
Persibel Belitung U-17 became the champion.

South Sumatra Zone
The final was played in Stadion Serasan Sekate on 30 August 2014. Persimuba U-17 became the champion and qualify to the regional round.

|-

|}

Lampung Zone
The matches will be played in Stadion Tejosari in Metro from 20 September until 30 September 2014. Persilat Lampung Tengah U-17 became the champion.

Banten Zone

Four team will participate in this zone. Persikota U-17 became champion of this zone.

DKI Jakarta Zone

Urakan FC U-17 became champion of this zone.

West Java Zone
This zone consists of 25 clubs divided into 5 groups. The top three from each group will go through to the second round and also the top ranked fourth-placed team. Matches will start on 1 September 2014.

First round

Group A
PSB Bogor U-17, Persikasi Bekasi U-17 and Maisa FC U-17 qualified from this group. Sukabumi FC U-17 qualifies as best fourth-placed team.

Group B
Persikabo Bogor U-17, Kabomania U-17 and Blaster FC U-17 qualified from this group.

Group C
Persika Karawang U-17, Persipo Purwakarta U-17 and Benpica U-17 qualified from this group.

Group D
Bina Putra Sentra Cirebon U-17, Pesik Kuningan U-17 and Persikas Subang U-17 qualified from this group.

Group E
Bandung Legend U-17, Persib Bandung U-17 and Persima Majalengka U-17 qualified from this group.

Second round
Matches starting this round until the semi-finals will be played in Stadion Galuh, Ciamis.

|}

Quarter-finals

|}

Semi-finals

|}

Third-placed

|}

Final
Final and third-placed matches will be played in Singaperbangsa Stadium, Karawang. Persib Bandung U-17 became champion.

|}

Central Java Zone

Persis Solo U-17 was the champion of the zone and qualified for the national round.

|-

|}

Yogyakarta Zone
PSS Sleman U-17 became the champion.

East Java Zone

Matches for group A will be played at Stadion Diponegoro and Stadion Maron in Banyuwangi. Matches for group D will be played at Stadion Gelora Supriyadi in Blitar.

The second round will consists of 12 teams, in which group winners and the best runner-up from all groups will qualify for the knockout stage.

First round

Group A
Jember United U-17 and PSIL Lumajang U-17 qualified from this group.

Group B
Persekap Pasuruan U-17 and Persebaya Surabaya U-17 qualified from this group.

Group C
Persema 1953 Malang U-17 and Persid Jember U-17 qualified from this group.

Group D
Triple S Kediri U-17 and PSBK Blitar U-17 qualified from this group.

Group E
Persik Kediri U-17 and Akademi Arema Ngunut Tulungagung U-17 qualified from this group.

Group F
Persekam Metro FC U-17 and Persela Lamongan U-17 qualified from this group.

Second round
This round will be played from 29 September until 3 October 2014.

Group G

Group H

Group I

Ranking of second-placed teams

Semi-finals

Final
The final will be played in Madiun on October 14, 2014. Jember United U-17 became champion.

East Kalimantan Zone
Group A will be played in Tenggarong and the other group in Sangatta. Winners and runners-up from both groups will qualify to the knockout stage.

Group stage

Group A

Group B
Both Kutim U-17 (group winner) and Bontang U-17 (group runner-up) qualified to the semifinals.

Final
Bontang U-17 qualifies to the regional round after beating Paser U-17 in the semi-final and Kutim U-17 in the final.

South Kalimantan Zone
Persepan Pagatan U-17 became champion.

South Sulawesi Zone
Matches will start on 25 September 2014. Semi-finals and final will be played on 6–7 October 2014. Makassar U-17 became champion.

Semi-finals

|-

|}

Final

|-

|}

Bali Zone
Five teams participated in this zone. PS Badung U-17 became the champion and qualifies from this zone.

East Nusa Tenggara Zone

PS Kota Kupang U-17 won the zone and qualifies for the next round.

North Maluku Zone
Seven teams will participate in this zone and all the matches will be played in Gelora Kieraha Stadium. Persiter U-17 qualified from this zone.

Final

|-

|}

Maluku Zone

Nusa Ina U-17 was the champion of this zone. They finished first in the group that consists of two other teams with eight points but having more goal difference than Persenal U-17.

Regional round

Regional I

Regional II

Regional III

Regional IV

Regional V
PS Kota Kupang U-17 and PS Badung U-17 qualified to the next round as winner and runner-up respectively.

Regional VI
PSM Makassar U-17 and Persigo Gorontalo U-17 qualified to the next round as winner and runner-up respectively.

Regional VII
Bontang FC U-17 and Persepan Pagatan U-17 qualified from this region.

Regional VIII
Persiter U-17 and Nusa Ina U-17 both qualified from the region as winner and runner-up respectively.

National round
16 teams from the regional round will compete in two stages before the semi-finals and final using home tournament format. Matches for the first stage will be played from 14–19 November 2014, the second stage and knockout stage will be played from 22 November 2014.

First stage

Group 1

Group 2

Group 3
Bontang FC U-17 and Nusa Ina U-17 qualified from this region.

Group 4
Persiter U-17 and Persigo Gorontalo U-17 qualified from this region.

Knockout stage
Quarterfinal matches will be played in Bandung and Malang. Sidoarjo will host semifinal and final matches.

Quarter-finals

Semi-finals

Third-placed

Final

References

2014 in Indonesian football
2014